Chola (English: Shadow of Water) is a 2019 Indian Malayalam-language psychological drama film directed by Sanal Kumar Sasidharan and produced by Joju George, and co-produced by Shaji Mathew and Aruna Mathew. The film stars Joju George, Nimisha Sajayan and Akhil Viswanath.

Plot

An adolescent school girl and her teenage lover meet across at the village by dawn to set out for a trip to the town. Infuriated by the presence of a stranger along with the boy, she expresses her hesitance. However, he comforts and convinces her that the stranger will leave them at the bus stop and the trio begins their journey. Passing through the hilly peripheral suburbs of Kerala, they reach out at the heart of the city. Tall buildings to shopping precinct, the girl is astounded and excited. Resuming their journey back in the evening, things take a wild turn, later unfolding inevitable intriguing incidents.

Cast
Nimisha Sajayan as Janaki
Joju George as Boss
Akhil Viswanath as Janaki's lover

Festivals
Venice International Film Festival - Orizonti Competition
Geneva International Film Festival - International Feature Competition
Tokyo Filmex - International Competition

References

External links
 

Films directed by Sanal Kumar Sasidharan
2010s Malayalam-language films